New Holland is a settlement in Jamaica.

References

Populated places in Jamaica